Artemi Vicent Rallo Lombarte is a Spanish politician. He was elected to the Congress of Deputies in the 2015 general election, standing as a Socialist Party of the Valencian Country (PSPV-PSOE) candidate in Castellón province.

Rallo Lombarte has been a member of the Corts Valencianes. He holds a PhD in Law. Rallo Lombarte teaches Constitutional Law at Universidad Jaume I. He served as director of the Agencia Española de Protección de Datos between 2007 and 2011.

References

Living people
Members of the 11th Congress of Deputies (Spain)
Members of the 12th Congress of Deputies (Spain)
Members of the Corts Valencianes
Members of the 13th Senate of Spain
Members of the 14th Senate of Spain
Place of birth missing (living people)
Spanish Socialist Workers' Party politicians
Year of birth missing (living people)